Camryn Rogers (born June 7, 1999) is a Canadian athlete specializing in the hammer throw. Internationally she is the 2022 World silver medallist, 2022 Commonwealth champion, 2018 World U20 champion, and represented Canada at the 2020 Summer Olympics. She competed as a member of the California Golden Bears track and field team, winning three NCAA outdoor titles.

Early life
Rogers was born and raised in Richmond, British Columbia. Following her parents' divorce when she was three years old, she was raised by her mother, Shari Rogers, a hairdresser. Her mother would later say, "for many years, it was just her and I. Many struggles along the way. A lot of hardships." Rogers did not initially participate in any sports, but first tried the hammer throw on January 5, 2012, upon the recommendation of one of her mother's clients, who was a member of the Richmond Kajaks track club. She would later say, "fifteen minutes before the start of the first practice of the new year. I just decided I should go. There was no way of knowing until you did it." Rogers cited the 2012 Summer Olympics in London some months afterward as solidifying her interest in becoming an elite athlete.

In 2017, Rogers was a high school champion in hammer throw and was recruited by several American universities. She opted to attend the University of California, Berkeley, where she would complete two academic degrees.

Competitive career
Following her high school graduation, Rogers won the women's hammer throw event at the 2017 Canadian U20 Championships and then won the same event at the 2017 Pan American U20 Athletics Championships. She was initially named to the British Columbian team for the Canada Summer Games but withdrew in order to focus on preparations for her time at Berkeley. The following year, she won the women's hammer throw at the 2018 IAAF World U20 Championships, saying it was "really special. I think the thought of me being the world champion will really hit me later."

In 2019, Rogers won gold at the 2019 NCAA Division I Outdoor Track and Field Championships. This was a California student's first championship title in women's track and field since 2008. Athletics Canada awarded her the Eric E. Coy Trophy as national U20 athlete of the year. Rogers went on to make her debut at senior international championships, placing sixth in the hammer event at the 2019 Pan American Games in Lima.

The onset of the COVID-19 pandemic resulted in the cancellation of much of the 2020 athletics season and the delay by a full year of the 2020 Summer Olympics, where Rogers had hoped to compete. With the resumption of major competition in 2021, Rogers won her second women's hammer throw title at the 2021 NCAA Division I Outdoor Track and Field Championships. Afterward she was named to the Canadian team for the 2020 Summer Olympics in Tokyo. She advanced to the final of the hammer throw event, the first Canadian woman to ever do so, and finished fifth.

Rogers won the bronze medal in the weight throw at NCAA Indoor Track & Field Championships, setting a new national record in the event . She then won her third title at the 2022 NCAA Division I Outdoor Track and Field Championships, setting another championship record with the ninth-best distance (77.67 m) in the history of women's hammer throw. Rogers then made her World Athletics Championships debut at the 2022 edition in Eugene, Oregon. Qualifying to the final of the hammer throw event, she won the silver medal with a best throw of 75.52 m. This was the first World medal for a Canadian woman in a field sport. In her second major international championship of the season, Rogers was part of the Canadian team for the 2022 Commonwealth Games in Birmingham. On her first and only throw in the qualification round of the hammer throw, she managed a distance of 74.68 m, breaking the Commonwealth Games record previously held by fellow Canadian Sultana Frizell. Rogers went on to win the title with a 74.08 m third throw in the final, finishing four a half metres clear of silver medalist Julia Ratcliffe of New Zealand. Fellow Canadian thrower Jillian Weir joined her on the podium as bronze medalist.

Championship results

References

External links

 (Track & Field Results Reporting System)

Living people
California Golden Bears women's track and field athletes
Canadian female hammer throwers
1999 births
People from Richmond, British Columbia
Athletes (track and field) at the 2019 Pan American Games
Pan American Games track and field athletes for Canada
United States collegiate record holders in athletics (track and field)
World Athletics U20 Championships winners
Athletes (track and field) at the 2020 Summer Olympics
Olympic track and field athletes of Canada
University of California, Berkeley alumni
20th-century Canadian women
21st-century Canadian women
Athletes (track and field) at the 2022 Commonwealth Games
Commonwealth Games medallists in athletics
Commonwealth Games gold medallists for Canada
Medallists at the 2022 Commonwealth Games